The October 1997 North American storm complex was a blizzard and tornado outbreak that affected the Northwest, Rockies, much of the Midwest and Deep south. 84 tornadoes were confirmed as the system moved eastward across the eastern half of the United States, including four that were rated as F3 on the Fujita scale.

The storms resulted in 13 deaths (five in Colorado, two each in Nebraska and Illinois, and one each in Michigan, Iowa, Oklahoma, and Kansas), and caused power outages and school closings lasting up to a week in affected areas. The event was famously billed by the University of Nebraska-Lincoln as being a "two-hundred year storm". The wind caused much damage, downing trees and power poles.

1997 in North America
Tornadoes in the United States
Tornadoes of 1997
October 1997 events in the United States